Paul H. Harvey  (born 19 January 1947) is a British evolutionary biologist. He is Professor of Zoology and was head of the zoology department at the University of Oxford from 1998 to 2011 and Secretary of the Zoological Society of London from 2000 to 2011, holding these posts in conjunction with a professorial fellowship at Jesus College, Oxford.

Education
Harvey was educated at the University of York where he was awarded Bachelor of Science and Doctor of Philosophy degrees.

Research and career
Harvey has led the development of robust statistical methods to decipher evolutionary relationships. His work has applied a rigorous basis to the comparative method in evolutionary biology — employed since the days of Charles Darwin — and as such, he has shaped modern thinking in the field. The comparative method of evolutionary biology is used to correlate characteristics between species. Paul pioneered techniques to use the data and knowledge available in modern science, whilst avoiding artefacts, in untangling the evolutionary relationships between organisms. These problem-solving tools for evolutionary studies have become widely used.

His former students include Oliver Pybus, Georgina Mace, Andrew Read, Andrew Rambaut and Eddie Holmes.

Selected publications

Harvey, P.H. Martin, R.D., & Clutton-Brock, T.H. (1987) Life Histories in Comparative Perspective. In Primate Societies. Smuts, B.B., Cheney, D.L., Seyfarth, R.M., Wrangham, R.W., Struhsaker, T.T. (eds). Chicago & London:University of Chicago Press. pp. 181–196 
Harvey, P.H. & Pagel, M.D. (1991) The Comparative Method in Evolutionary Biology. Oxford Monographs in Ecology and Evolution edited by Harvey, P.H. and May, R.M.. Oxford University Press.

. Also see  and

Awards and honours
Harvey was elected a Fellow of the Royal Society (FRS) in 1992 in recognition of his status as a leading evolutionary biologist of his era. Harvey was awarded the Scientific Medal and the Frink Award from the Zoological Society of London, the J. Murray Luck Award from the National Academy of Sciences, and the University of Helsinki Medal. He is an ISI highly cited researcher.

From 2000 to 2011, he served as Secretary of the Zoological Society of London (constitutionally the Chief Executive responsible for London and Whipsnade Zoos, the Institute of Zoology, and the Conservation Programmes)

He was appointed Commander of the Order of the British Empire (CBE) in the 2008 Birthday Honours.

References

Living people
1947 births
English biologists
British evolutionary biologists
Fellows of the Royal Society
Fellows of Jesus College, Oxford
Fellows of the Zoological Society of London
Commanders of the Order of the British Empire
Secretaries of the Zoological Society of London
Fellows of Merton College, Oxford